Rogation may refer to:

 Rogation days, as marked on the Christian calendar of the Western Church
 Rogatio, the constitutional procedure by which a bill became law in ancient Rome
Rogation of the Ninevites, seventy days before Easter in the East Syriac Rite
Lex Publilia (471 BC), a law also known as the Publilian Rogation
Lex Licinia Sextia, a series of laws lso known as the Licinian Rogations (368 BC)

See also
Rogationists